Micralictoides ruficaudus is a species of sweat bee in the family Halictidae. It is found in North America.

References

Further reading

 

Halictidae
Articles created by Qbugbot
Insects described in 1937